Australopithecina or Hominina is a subtribe in the tribe Hominini. The members of the subtribe are generally Australopithecus (cladistically including the genera Homo, Paranthropus, and Kenyanthropus), and it typically includes the earlier Ardipithecus, Orrorin, Sahelanthropus, and Graecopithecus. All these closely related species are now sometimes collectively termed australopiths or homininians. They are the extinct, close relatives of humans and, with the extant genus Homo, comprise the human clade. Members of the human clade, i.e. the Hominini after the split from the chimpanzees, are now called Hominina (see Hominidae; terms "hominids" and hominins).

While none of the groups normally directly assigned to this group survived, the australopiths do not appear to be literally extinct (in the sense of having no living descendants) as the genera Kenyanthropus, Paranthropus and Homo probably emerged as sister of a late Australopithecus species such as A. africanus and/or A. sediba.

The term australopithecine came from a former classification as members of a distinct subfamily, the Australopithecinae. Members of Australopithecus are sometimes referred to as the "gracile australopiths", while Paranthropus are called the "robust australopiths".

The australopiths occurred in the Late Miocene sub-epoch and were bipedal, and they were dentally similar to humans, but with a brain size not much larger than that of modern non-human apes, with lesser encephalization than in the genus Homo. Humans (genus Homo) may have descended from australopith ancestors and the genera Ardipithecus, Orrorin, Sahelanthropus, and Graecopithecus are the possible ancestors of the australopiths.

Classification 
Australopithecina 
Australopithecus
Australopithecus africanus
Australopithecus deyiremeda
Australopithecus garhi
Australopithecus sediba
Australopithecus afarensis (=Praeanthropus afarensis)
Australopithecus anamensis (=Praeanthropus anamensis)
Australopithecus bahrelghazali (=Praeanthropus bahrelghazali)
Paranthropus
Paranthropus robustus
Paranthropus boisei
Paranthropus aethiopicus
Ardipithecus
Ardipithecus ramidus
Ardipithecus kadabba
Orrorin
Orrorin tugenensis
Sahelanthropus
Sahelanthropus tchadensis
Graecopithecus
Graecopithecus freybergi
Graecopithecus macedoniensis

Phylogeny 
Phylogeny of Hominina/Australopithecina according to Dembo et al. (2016).

Physical characteristics 
The post-cranial remains of australopiths show they were adapted to bipedal locomotion, but did not walk identically to humans. They have a high brachial index (forearm/upper arm ratio) when compared to other hominins, and they exhibit greater sexual dimorphism than members of Homo or Pan but less so than Gorilla or Pongo. The brain size may have been 350 cc to 600 cc. The postcanines (the teeth behind the canines) were relatively large, and had more enamel compared to contemporary apes and humans, whereas the incisors and canines were relatively small, and there was little difference between the males' and females' canines compared to modern apes.

Relation to Homo
Most scientists maintain that the genus Homo emerged in Africa within the Australopiths around two million years ago. However, there is no consensus on within which species:

Asian australopiths

A minority-held view among palaeoanthropologists is that australopiths moved outside Africa. A notable proponent of this theory is Jens Lorenz Franzen, formerly Head of Paleoanthropology at the Research Institute Senckenberg. Franzen argues that robust australopiths had reached not only Indonesia, as Meganthropus, but also China:

In 1957, an Early Pleistocene Chinese fossil tooth of unknown province was described as resembling P. robustus. Three fossilized molars from Jianshi, China (Longgudong Cave) were later identified as belonging to an Australopithecus species. However further examination questioned this interpretation; Zhang (1984) argued the Jianshi teeth and unidentified tooth belong to H. erectus. Liu et al. (2010) also dispute the Jianshi-australopithecine link and argue the Jianshi molars fall within the range of Homo erectus:

But, Wolpoff (1999) notes that in China "persistent claims of australopithecine or australopithecine-like remains continue".

See also

 Dawn of Humanity (2015 PBS film)
 Human taxonomy
 Human timeline

Notes

References

External links

Informative lecture on Australopithecines

 
Human evolution
Pliocene
Hominini